The Dosanjh ministry was the combined Cabinet (formally the Executive Council of British Columbia) that governed British Columbia from February 24, 2000, to June 5, 2001. It was led by Ujjal Dosanjh, the 33rd premier of British Columbia, and consisted of members of the New Democratic Party (NDP).

The Dosanjh ministry was in office for the last fourteen months of the 36th Parliament of British Columbia. It was the third ministry to exist during that parliament, following the Glen Clark ministry (1996–1999) and the Miller ministry (1999–2000). Dosanjh was sworn in as premier on February 24, 2000, with his initial cabinet following five days later.

Following the 2001 election, which the NDP lost, it was replaced by the Campbell ministry.

List of ministers

Cabinet shuffles 
Dosanjh shuffled his cabinet on November 1, 2000. The shuffle was undertaken to replace seven cabinet ministers who had decided not run in the impending election. In a surprise move, Dosanjh named Edward John, the Grand Chief of the First Nations Summit of British Columbia and not an MLA, to cabinet. John was the second indigenous cabinet minister in BC, after Frank Calder in the 1970s.

References

Citations

Sources

Politics of British Columbia
Executive Council of British Columbia
2000 establishments in British Columbia
Cabinets established in 2000
2001 disestablishments in British Columbia
Cabinets disestablished in 2001